Yakkima is a rural locality located in Lakhdenpokhsky District of the Republic of Karelia, Russia.

History

Jaakkima was originally called Jaakkimanvaara (Jaakkima's hill), first mentioned in 1589 as Jacon wara in Swedish sources. It became a separate parish in 1647, having been formed from parts of the Kurkijoki, Sortavala and Uukuniemi parishes.

The Jaakkima municipality became smaller in the 1920s, as Lumivaara was separated from it in 1923. Lahdenpohja (Lakhdenpokhya) was separated soon after in 1924.

As a result of the Winter War Yakkima was occupied by and ceded to the Soviet Union. Finland occupied Yakkima in the Continuation War in 1941, but the Soviet Union regained the territory in 1944 in accordance with the Moscow Armistice. Most of its inhabitants were relocated to the area surrounding Seinäjoki.

Church

In 1845, with the financial assistance of the landowner Alexander Kushelev-Bezborodko, the construction of a new Lutheran church in Yakkima was started. The church was designed by Carl Ludvig Engel. The construction took five years and the church was consecrated on 19 October 1851. In 1977 the church was gutted in a fire.

References

Karelia
Rural localities in the Republic of Karelia
Lakhdenpokhsky District